Versus Evil, LLC is an American video game publisher founded by former ZeniMax Online Studios marketing director Steve Escalante to focus on the independent video game market. Versus Evil's staff is located in California, Texas, and Maryland.

History
On January 14, 2014, Versus Evil launched Stoic's role-playing strategy game, The Banner Saga, which received praise as one of the top indie titles of 2014. Versus Evil continued to spread its distribution throughout the globe by launching Dragons and Titans, a free-to-play multiplayer online battle arena game, and the Steam Early Access version of Habitat, which it expects to launch at retail in 2015.  In August 2014 at Gamescom in Cologne, Germany, Versus Evil announced several key developer partnerships including Tangrin Studios based in the Netherlands, who are working on an action role-playing title, Kyn, and SwordTales, a Brazilian indie developer, who are working on their first video game, Toren, a puzzle platform adventure game.  Also part of this announcement was the development of a sequel to the third-person action game Afro Samurai, currently called Afro Samurai 2: Revenge of Kuma, being developed by indie developer Redacted Studios.  In September 2014, Versus Evil launched their first mobile title by bringing The Banner Saga to the iPhone, iPad and iPod Touch.

On February 8, 2021, the Nintendo Switch port of Pillars of Eternity was abandoned by Versus Evil while still containing significant bugs, with no refunds offered.

In November 2021, tinyBuild acquired Versus Evil and Red Cerberus.

Games published

References

External links

2013 establishments in Texas
Companies based in Austin, Texas
Video game companies based in Texas
Video game publishers
Video game companies established in 2013
2021 mergers and acquisitions